Forrest City High School is a comprehensive public high school in Forrest City, Arkansas, United States. It is the sole high school administered by the Forrest City School District and its main feeder school is Forrest City Junior High School.

In addition to Forrest City it serves other areas in central St. Francis County, including Caldwell, Colt, Madison, and Widener.

History 
Serving students in grades nine through twelve since 1892, an earlier building on Rosser Street built in 1915, known as Old Central, is listed on the National Register of Historic Places since 1992.

Academics 
Forrest City High School is accredited as a 1924 charter member of AdvancED (formerly North Central Association). The assumed course of study follows the Smart Core curriculum established by the Arkansas Department of Education (ADE).

Students engage in regular and Advanced Placement (AP) coursework and exams. FCHS is a member of the Arkansas Advanced Initiative for Math and Science (AAIMS) designed to improve scores on AP exams.

Extracurricular activities 
The Forrest City High School mascot is the Mustang horse with the school colors as Royal blue and white.  The Forrest City Mustangs compete in the 5A East Conference administered by the Arkansas Activities Association (AAA).

The Mustangs have won several state championships including:

 Golf: The boys golf team are 2-time state golf champions (1969, 1973).
 Basketball: The Mustangs boys basketball team won its first state championship in 2014 and another in 2016.
 Track and field: The boys track teams are 6-time state track and field champions; winning three consecutive state titles in 1975, 1976 and 1977, followed by two consecutive track banners in 2006 and 2007 again in 2016.

Notable alumni 
 Don Kessinger (1960) - 6x Major League Baseball All-Star player; manager of Chicago White Sox in 1979; high school All-American and NFHS National High School Hall of Fame inductee
 Stan Winfrey (1971) - former professional football player
 Jimmy Rogers (1973) - former professional football player
 Jason Jones (2003) - former professional football player
 Barrett Astin (2009) - former professional baseball player
 Cara McCollum (2010) - Miss New Jersey 2013; Miss America Contestant in 2014; news anchor
 Leo Fong (c.1946) - Actor and martial artist

References

External links 
 

School buildings on the National Register of Historic Places in Arkansas
Educational institutions established in 1892
Neoclassical architecture in Arkansas
Public high schools in Arkansas
National Register of Historic Places in St. Francis County, Arkansas
Forrest City, Arkansas
1892 establishments in Arkansas
Schools in St. Francis County, Arkansas